Lyte is a surname. Notable people with the surname include:

Christian Lyte (1989–), English cyclist
Eliphalet Oram Lyte (1842–1913), American educator
Farnham Maxwell-Lyte (1828–1906), English chemist and photographic pioneer
Henry Lyte (botanist) (1529–1607), English botanist and antiquary 
Henry Francis Lyte (1793–1847), Anglican divine and hymn-writer 
Henry Maxwell Lyte (1848–1940), Deputy Keeper of the Public Records, 1886–1926, and historian
Lavinia Lyte, fictional character in the novel Johnny Tremain by Esther Forbes
Lyte, a band member of Delta-S
MC Lyte, stage name of rap artist Lana Michele Moorer (b 1971)

See also
Lytes Cary, manor house in Somerset, England, once owned by the Lyte family
Leicht (surname)
Leight (surname)
Light (disambiguation)
Light (surname)
Licht (surname)
Lite (disambiguation)
Lyte (disambiguation)